The 2020 Monza FIA Formula 2 round was a pair of motor races for Formula 2 cars that took place on 5-6 September 2020 at the Autodromo Nazionale Monza in Monza, Italy as part of the FIA Formula 2 Championship. It was the eighth round of the 2020 FIA Formula 2 Championship and ran in support of the 2020 Italian Grand Prix.

Report
Ilott repeated his previous year success in Monza qualifying, grabbing another pole. But pit stop struggles left him without the chance of taking the podium. The race was won by Schumacher, who was victorious in the feature race for the first time. He was accompanied by Ghiotto and Lundgaard on podium, with the former equalling the all-time record of 23 podiums by last year's champion Nyck de Vries.

In the sprint race Ticktum crossed the finish line first after dominating the race, but he was disqualified due to a lack of fuel. Ilott inherited the win and retook the lead in the championship from Shwartzman.

Classification

Qualifying

Feature race 

Note：
 - Marcus Armstrong originally finished eleventh, but was given a five-second-overtime penalty for forcing Guanyu Zhou off the track.

Sprint race 

Note：
 - Dan Ticktum originally finished first, but he was later disqualified due to lack of fuel on finish.

Standings after the event

Drivers' Championship standings

Teams' Championship standings

 Note: Only the top five positions are included for both sets of standings.

See also 
2020 Italian Grand Prix
2020 Monza Formula 3 round

References

External links 
 

Monza
Formula 2
Auto races in Italy
Monza Formula 2 round